Blake Burdette (born January 19, 1980 in Minneapolis) is a rugby coach and former American rugby union hooker or prop. He was a member of the United States national rugby union team and made his international debut in 2006 against Uruguay. Burdette played for the USA Eagles in the 2007 Rugby World Cup. Currently, he has returned to playing professionally with Utah Warriors having come out of retirement aged 39, 12 years after previous professional rugby playing experience.

In 2002, Burdette played as a University of Utah football walk-on. In his senior year, Burdette was nicknamed the 'Utah Man' on the campus' football team. Burdette played every game in the 2004 season for the Utah Utes football team, and played for the Utes as an 4x All-American rugby player (2003-2006), before dedicating his time to playing professional rugby in England. His England rugby career lasted only one season due to injury.

Coaching
In 2007, Burdette joined the Utah Utes rugby team as assistant coach, taking over as head coach in 2009, but resigned after the team was suspended for misuse of branding.

In 2015, Burdette was hired as head coach of The Pennsylvania State University's Men's Rugby Team. Burdette is the first full-time, university employed head coach in the history of PSU Rugby.

References

1980 births
Living people
Rugby union props
American rugby union players
American rugby union coaches
United States international rugby union players
Sportspeople from Minneapolis
Utah Warriors players
Sports coaches from Minneapolis